The 2012 season was Daejeon Citizen's sixteenth season in the K-League in South Korea. Daejeon Citizen will be competing in K-League and Korean FA Cup.

Current squad

Out on loan

Transfer

In

Out

Coaching staff

Match results

K-League

All times are Korea Standard Time (KST) – UTC+9

League table

Results summary

Results by round

Korean FA Cup

Squad statistics

Appearances
Statistics accurate as of match played 27 June 2012

Goals and assists

Discipline

References

Daejeon Citizen
2012